The Mercy Brown vampire incident occurred in Rhode Island, US, in 1892. It is one of the best documented cases of the exhumation of a corpse in order to perform rituals to banish an undead manifestation. The incident was part of the wider New England vampire panic.

Several cases of consumption (tuberculosis) occurred in the family of George and Mary Brown in Exeter, Rhode Island. Friends and neighbors believed that this was due to the influence of the undead. An attempt was made to remediate. Mercy Brown died January 1892 aged 19.

History
In Exeter, Rhode Island, several members of George and Mary Brown's family suffered a sequence of tuberculosis infections in the final two decades of the 19th century. Tuberculosis was called "consumption" at the time, and was a devastating and much-feared disease.

The mother, Mary Eliza, was the first to die of the disease, followed in 1884 by their eldest daughter, Mary Olive, according to her grave stone. In 1891, daughter Mercy and son Edwin also contracted the disease. Friends and neighbors of the family believed that one of the dead family members was a vampire, although they did not use that name, and had caused Edwin's illness. This was in accordance with threads of contemporary folklore, which linked multiple deaths in one family to undead activity. Consumption was a poorly understood condition at the time and the subject of much superstition.

George Brown was persuaded to give permission to exhume several bodies of his family members.  Villagers, the local doctor, and a newspaper reporter exhumed the bodies on March 17, 1892. The bodies of both Mary and Mary Olive exhibited the expected level of decomposition, so they were thought not to be the cause. However, the corpse of a daughter, Mercy, exhibited almost no decomposition, and still had blood in the heart. This was taken as a sign that the young woman was undead and the agent of young Edwin's condition. Her lack of decomposition was more likely due to her body being stored in freezer-like conditions in an above-ground crypt during the two months following her death.

As superstition dictated, Mercy's heart and liver were burned, and the ashes were mixed with water to create a tonic and was given to the sick Edwin to drink, as an effort to resolve his illness and stop the influence of the undead. The young man died two months later. What remained of Mercy's body was buried in the cemetery of the Baptist Church in Exeter after being desecrated.

Popular culture
The Mercy Brown incident was the inspiration for Caitlín R. Kiernan's short story "So Runs the World Away", which makes explicit reference to the affair.  It has also been suggested by scholars that Bram Stoker, the author of the novel Dracula, knew about the Mercy Brown case through newspaper articles and based the novel's character Lucy Westenra upon her. It is also referred to in  H. P. Lovecraft's "The Shunned House". Mercy Brown's story was the inspiration for the young adult novel Mercy: The Last New England Vampire by Sarah L. Thomson. An account of the events as told by the remaining descendants of Mercy is available in Michael E. Bell's Food for the Dead: On the Trail of New England's Vampires.

The Mercy Brown story was the main subject of the first episode of the Lore podcast in 2015, as well as the first episode of the television adaptation of the same title in 2017.

The MonsterQuest episode "Vampires In America" investigated the Mercy Brown case and used it as a reference in the investigation.  

American rock band Clutch has a song titled "Mercy Brown" on their 2022 album Sunrise on Slaughter Beach.

The story of Mercy Brown is also prominently featured in Paul Tremblay's novel The Pallbearer's Club.

References

General references

External links

Smithsonian Magazine account of Historical Vampires

19th-century deaths from tuberculosis
American folklore
Vampires
Tuberculosis deaths in Rhode Island
Exeter, Rhode Island
Washington County, Rhode Island
1892 deaths
1870s births
1892 in Rhode Island
Burials in Rhode Island
Death customs